The 6th constituency of Isère is one of ten French legislative constituencies in the Isère département.

After the 2010 redistricting of French legislative constituencies added a tenth constituency to Isère, the 6th constituency consisted of the (pre-2015 cantonal re-organisation) cantons of Bourgoin-Jallieu-Nord, Crémieu, Morestel and Pont-de-Chéruy.

Deputies

Election Results

2022

 
 
 
 
 
|-
| colspan="8" bgcolor="#E9E9E9"|
|-

2017

2012

2007

 
 
 
 
 
 
 
|-
| colspan="8" bgcolor="#E9E9E9"|
|-

2002

 
 
 
 
|-
| colspan="8" bgcolor="#E9E9E9"|
|-

1997

 
 
 
 
 
 
 
|-
| colspan="8" bgcolor="#E9E9E9"|
|-

References

6